Pac-Man is a 1982 maze video game developed and published by Atari, Inc. under official license by Namco, and an adaptation of the 1980 hit arcade game of the same name. The player controls the title character, who attempts to consume all of the wafers while avoiding four ghosts that pursue him. Eating flashing wafers at the corners of the screen will cause the ghosts to turn temporarily blue and flee, allowing Pac-Man to eat them for bonus points. (Once eaten, a ghost was reduced to a mobile pair of eyes, which had to return to the center of the maze to be restored.)

The game was programmed by Tod Frye, taking six months to complete. Anticipating high sales, Atari produced over 1 million copies for its launch and held a "National Pac-Man Day" on April 3, 1982, to help promote its release.

It stands as the best-selling Atari 2600 game of all time, selling over  copies, and was the all-time best-selling video game up until then. Despite its commercial success, Pac-Man was lambasted by critics for poor visuals and sound, and for bearing little resemblance to the original game. It is often considered one of the worst video games ever made and one of the worst arcade game ports released.

Gameplay

Pac-Man is a variation of the original arcade game, which was released by Namco in 1980. It features similar—but not identical—gameplay.

The player uses a joystick to control Pac-Man, navigating him through a maze of consumable dashes called Video Wafers, opposed by a quartet of multi-colored ghosts. The goal of the game is to consume all the wafers in each level in order to proceed to the next level. The score from each level is then combined to a total, with the aim of achieving the highest possible score. The four ghosts roam the maze, trying to kill Pac-Man. If any of the ghosts touches Pac-Man, he loses a life; when all lives have been lost, the game ends. Each game starts with four lives, and the player is awarded a bonus life upon successful completion of each level, up to a maximum of nine lives in reserve at any given time.

Near the corners of the maze are four larger, flashing consumables known as Power Pills that provide Pac-Man with the temporary ability to eat the ghosts and earn bonus points. When a Power Pill is in effect the enemies turn blue and try to evade Pac-Man. When a ghost is eaten its disembodied eyes return to the nest (center box) to respawn. The blue ghosts turn reddish during the last moments of a Power Pill's effect, signaling that they are about to become dangerous again, and the length of time for which the enemies remain vulnerable varies from one level to the next, becoming shorter as the game progresses. The final consumable items are the Vitamins, which appear periodically directly below the nest.

The game has eight variations, offering two different starting speeds for Pac-Man and four speeds for the ghosts. The ghosts get slightly faster each subsequent round, but Pac-Man stays at the same speed. The console's A–B difficulty switches can also be used to handicap one or both players: in the A (hard) position, the power pills' effects do not last as long.

Differences from the original 
Overall the game follows the format of the original, but it differs in a number of key respects.  The design is oriented in landscape rather than portrait mode; the wraparound Warp Tunnel is located at the top and bottom of the screen rather than the sides. The maze layout and overall color scheme also differ from the original. Pac-Man himself features an eye and he only faces left and right, never turning to face up or down when traveling in those directions. The ghosts' eyes constantly cycle through four directions rather than being fixed in their current direction of travel. The maze contains 126 wafers, just over half of the arcade's 244 dots. The nest from which the ghosts emerge has its entrance on its right side instead of the top, and the arcade's eight distinct and differently valued bonus items (mostly fruits) are replaced by the nondescript single-value Vitamin.

Ghost behaviors are different from the original and dispense with the brief "rest" states whereby the ghosts periodically do not track Pac-Man, but each ghost still features a distinct individual method of tracking Pac-Man, with one pair being "smarter" in their pursuit choices and one member of each pair being faster than the other. In the arcade, when a ghost is eaten, its eyes return to the nest and it respawns and exits immediately in its normal (not vulnerable) state; in this version, the eyes remain in the nest until any Power Pill effects expire before they respawn and reemerge. A significant and notable difference with the arcade version is the ghosts' constant flickering.

The scoring for the home version is proportionally identical to the original except that each item is worth one-tenth its arcade value, with the bonus Vitamins as the only variation, being worth 100 points, which is the equivalent of the 1000 point scoring melon bonus item that appears in the seventh and eighth levels of the arcade game. Unlike the arcade version, if Pac-Man loses a life while the vitamin appears, the vitamin may not necessarily be forfeited.

This version does not feature the marquee screen and interstitial animations. Neither does it attempt to approximate the sounds of the original, reducing the iconic "wakka wakka" dot-eating and other bonus sounds to a single tone clank sound and single beep respectively, replacing the game start tune with a four-note motif, and dispensing with both the extra-life and omnipresent siren sounds.

Development

After Pac-Man proved to be a success in the United States, Atari decided to license the game and produce it for its Atari 2600 console.

Programming was assigned to Tod Frye, who was not provided with any arcade design specifications to work from and had to figure out how the game worked by playing it. He spent 80-hour weeks over six months developing it. The finished game uses a 4 KB ROM cartridge, chosen for its lower manufacturing costs compared to 8 KB bank-switched cartridges which had recently become available. As with any contemporary arcade port, the simple Atari 2600 hardware was a considerable limitation. The arcade PAC-MAN system board contained 2 KB of main RAM (random-access memory) in which to run the program, 2 KB of video RAM to store the screen state, and 16 KB of ROM (read-only memory) to store the game code, whereas the Atari 2600 featured only 128 bytes of RAM memory and none dedicated to video: effectively 32 times less RAM. The Zilog Z80 CPU microprocessor used by the Namco Pac-Man arcade system is clocked at three times the speed of the MOS 6507 CPU in the Atari 2600 - though the Z80 typically does less work per clock cycle.

To deal with these limitations, Frye simplified the maze's intricate pattern of corridors to a more repetitive pattern. The small tan pellets in the arcade original were changed to rectangular "wafers" that shared the wall color on 2600; a change necessitated because both the pellets and walls were drawn with the 2600's Playfield graphics, which have a fixed width. To achieve the visual effect of wafers disappearing as Pac-Man eats them, the actual map of the maze was updated as the data was written into the Playfield registers, excluding those pellets that had been eaten. The 2600's Player-Missile graphics system (sprites) was used for the remaining objects; the one-bit-wide Missiles were used to render the flashing power pills and the center of the vitamin. Pac-Man and ghost characters were implemented using the 2600's two Player objects, with one being used for Pac-Man and the other being used for all four ghosts, with the result that each ghost only appears once out of every four frames, which creates a flickering effect. This effect takes advantage of the slow phosphorescent fade of CRT monitors and the concept of persistence of vision, resulting in the image appearing to linger on screen longer, but the flickering remains noticeable, and makes each individual ghost's color nearly impossible to discern. Frye chose to abandon plans for a flicker-management system to minimize the flashing in part because Atari didn't seem to care about that issue in its zeal to have the game released. According to Frye, his game also did not conform to the arcade game's color scheme in order to comply with Atari's official home product policy that only space-type games should feature black backgrounds. Another quality impact was his decision that two-player gameplay was important, which meant that the 23 bytes required to store the current difficulty, state of the dots on the current maze, remaining lives, and the score had to be doubled for a second player, consuming 46 of the 2600's meager 128-byte memory, which precluded its use for additional game data and features.

Oft-repeated stories claim that the company wanted to or did release a prototype in order to capitalize on the 1981 holiday season; however, the retail release was a final product. Frye states that there were no negative comments within Atari about these elements, but, after seeing the game, Coin Division marketing manager Frank Ballouz reportedly informed Ray Kassar, Atari's president and CEO, that he felt enthusiasts would not want to play it. His opinion, however, was dismissed. The company ran newspaper ads and promoted the product in catalogs, describing it as differing "slightly from the original".

To help sales, Atari promoted and protected its exclusive licensing of Pac-Man. It took legal action against companies that released clones similar to Pac-Man. Atari sued Philips for its 1981 Magnavox Odyssey² game K.C. Munchkin! alleging copyright infringement. In the landmark case Atari, Inc. v. North American Philips Consumer Electronics Corp., the Court of Appeals allowed a preliminary injunction against Philips to prevent the sale of Munchkin cartridges. However, Atari failed to stop other games, such as On-Line Systems' Jawbreaker and Gobbler.

Several retailers assisted Atari with the release of the game. JCPenney was the first retailer to launch a nationwide advertising campaign on television for a software title. Continuing a long-standing relationship between it and Sears, Atari also produced Pac-Man cartridges under the department store's label.

Reception

Sales
Anticipation for the game was high. Atari stated in 1981 that it had preorders for "three or four million" copies of the Atari 2600 version. Goldman Sachs analyst Richard Simon predicted the sale of 9 million units during 1982, which would yield a profit of $200 million. Pac-Man met with initial commercial success; more than one million cartridges had been shipped in less than one month, helped by Atari's $1.5 million publicity campaign. It surpassed Space Invaders to become the best-selling Atari 2600 title and the overall best-selling video game up until then. Pac-Man also propelled Atari VCS sales to  units by 1982. Frye reportedly received $0.10 in royalties per copy.

Purchases had slowed by the summer of 1982, with unsold copies available in large quantities. Atari went on to sell over 684,000 cartridges in 1983. By 2004, the cartridges were still very common among collectors and enthusiasts—though the Sears versions were rarer—and priced lower.

Critical response

At release, critics negatively compared the port to its original arcade form, panning the audio-visuals and gameplay. On May 11, 1982, Electronic Games Magazine published its first bad review ever for an Atari video game, saying, "Considering the anticipation and considerable time the Atari designers had to work on it, it’s astonishing to see a home version of a classic arcade contest so devoid of what gave the original its charm". Video Magazine admitted it was "challenging, and there are a few visual pluses", before lamenting, "Unfortunately those who cannot evaluate Pac-Man through lover's eyes are likely to be disappointed". The premiere issue of Video Games Player from Fall 1982 called Pac-Man "just awful". Electronic Games gave the game a rating of four out of ten. Video Games Player magazine gave the graphics and sound its lowest rating of C, while giving the game an overall B− rating. Electronic Fun with Computers & Games
gave it an overall B− rating, with a C rating for graphics.

In 1983, Creative Computing Video & Arcade Games reviewer Danny Goodman commented that the game fails as a replica of its arcade form: "Atari stated clearly in its description of the cartridge that Atari's Pac-Man 'differs slightly from the original'. That, perhaps, was an understatement." Conversely, he stated that such criticism was unfair because the hardware could not properly emulate the arcade game. Goodman further said that the port is a challenging maze game in its own right, and it would have been a success if fans had not expected to play a game closer to the original. That year Phil Wiswell of Video Games criticized the game's poor graphics, mockingly referring to it as "Flickerman", while Softline questioned why Atari opposed Pac-Man clones when the 2600 version was less like the original "than any of the pack of imitators".

The game has remained poorly rated. Computer and Video Games magazine rated the game 57% in 1989. Next Generation magazine editors in 1998 called it the "worst coin-op conversion of all time", and attributed the mass dissatisfaction to its poor quality. In 2006, IGNs Craig Harris echoed similar statements and listed it as the worst arcade conversion, citing poor audio-visuals that did not resemble the original. Another IGN editor, Levi Buchanan, described it as a "disastrous port", citing the color scheme and flickering ghosts. Skyler Miller of AllGame said that although the game was only a passing resemblance to the original, it was charming despite its many differences and faults.

Frye did not express regret over his part in Pac-Mans port and felt he made the best decisions he could at the time. However, Frye stated that he would have done things differently with a larger capacity ROM. Video game industry researchers Nick Montfort and Ian Bogost attribute the poor reception to the technical differences between the 1977 Atari 2600 console and the 1980 arcade hardware used in Pac-Man cabinets. They further stated that the conversion is a lesson in maintaining the social and cultural context of the original source. Montfort and Bogost commented that players were disappointed with the flickering visual effect, which made the ghosts difficult to track and tired the players' eyes. The two further said that the effect diminishes the ghosts' personalities present in the arcade version. Chris Kohler of Wired commented that the game was poorly received upon its release and in contemporary times because of the poor quality. However, he further described the game as an impressive technical achievement given its console's limitations.

Impact and legacy

Initially, the excitement generated by Pac-Mans home release prompted retail stores to expand their inventory to sell video games. Drugstores began stocking video game cartridges, and toy retailers vied for new releases. Kmart and J. C. Penney competed against Sears to become the largest vendor of video games. The game's release also led to an increase in sales of the Atari 2600 console.

In retrospect, however, critics often cite Atari's Pac-Man as a major factor in the drop of consumer confidence in the company, which contributed to the video game crash of 1983. Bill Loguidice and Matt Barton of Gamasutra stated that the game's poor quality damaged the company's reputation. Buchanan commented that it disappointed millions of fans and diminished confidence in Atari's games. Former Next Generation editor-in-chief Neil West attributes his longtime skepticism of Atari's quality to the disappointment he had from buying the game as a child. Calling the game the top video game disaster, Buchanan credits Pac-Man as a factor to the downfall of Atari and the industry in the 1980s. Author Steven Kent also blames the game, along with Atari's E.T. the Extra-Terrestrial, for severely damaging the company's reputation and profitability. Montfort and Bogost stated that the game's negative reception seeded mistrust in retailers, which was reinforced by later factors that culminated in the crash.

On December 7, 1982, Atari owner Warner Communications announced that revenue forecasts for 1982 were cut from a 50 percent increase over 1981 to a 15 percent increase. Immediately following the announcement, the company's stock value dropped by around 35 percent—from $54 to $35—amounting to a loss of $1.3 billion in the company's market valuation. Warner admitted that Pac-Mans good sales despite poor quality made Atari overconfident about E.T. and Raiders of the Lost Ark, which did not sell well. In 1983, the company decreased its workforce by 30 percent and lost $356 million.

In late 1982, Atari ported Pac-Man to its new console, the Atari 5200. This version was a more accurate conversion of the original arcade game and was a launch title for the console, along with eleven other games.

The port was followed by conversions of Pac-Mans arcade sequels, Ms. Pac-Man and Jr. Pac-Man, for the Atari 2600. These used 8 KB ROM cartridges instead of Pac-Man'''s 4 KB and dispensed with two-player games. They were better received than Atari's first Pac-Man title and addressed many critics' complaints of Pac-Man''.

References

1982 video games
Atari 2600 games
Maze games
Pac-Man
Pack-in video games
Video games developed in the United States
Articles containing video clips